Guillaume Ormond (1896–1971) was a cathedral organist, who served at Truro Cathedral. He was the nephew of artist John Singer Sargent and uncle of Richard Ormond, who was the director of the National Maritime Museum from 1986 to 2000.

Background

(Francis) Guillaume Ormond was born on 27 January 1896 in Sanremo, Italy.

He was educated at Westminster School and the Royal College of Music and Exeter College, Oxford

Career

Assistant organist:
Chester Cathedral 1925–26
Ely Cathedral 1927–29

Organist of:
Truro Cathedral 1929–70

References

English classical organists
British male organists
Cathedral organists
1896 births
1971 deaths
People educated at Westminster School, London
Alumni of the Royal College of Music
Alumni of Exeter College, Oxford
20th-century classical musicians
20th-century English musicians
20th-century organists
20th-century British male musicians
20th-century British musicians
Male classical organists